Adrian High School is a public secondary school in Adrian, Michigan, United States. It serves students in grades 9-12 for the Adrian Public Schools.

Academics
Adrian High School is an International Baccalaureate world school.

Demographics
The demographic breakdown of the 798 students enrolled for the 2018-19 school year was: 
Male - 52.0%
Female - 48.0%
Native American/Alaskan - 0.5%
Asian - 2.6%
Black - 6.1%
Hispanic - 32.1%
White - 53.1%
Multiracial - 5.5%

46.5% of the students were eligible for free or reduced-cost lunch. For 2018-19, Adrian was a Title I school.

Athletics
Adrian's Maples compete in the Southeastern Conference. School colors are royal blue and white. The following Michigan High School Athletic Association (MHSAA) sanctioned sports are offered:

Baseball (boys) 
Basketball (girls and boys) 
Bowling (girls and boys) 
Competitive cheerleading (girls) 
Cross country (girls and boys) 
Football (boys) 
Golf (girls and boys) 
Gymnastics (girls) 
Ice hockey (boys) 
Soccer (girls and boys) 
Softball (girls) 
Swim and dive (girls and boys) 
Tennis (girls and boys) 
Track and field (girls and boys) 
Volleyball (girls) 
Wrestling (boys) 
State champion - 1973

Notable alumni

Rachel Andresen, (1907–1988), founder, Youth For Understanding
Kirk Baily, (1963–2022), actor
Marcus Benard, NFL defensive end
Kellen Davis, NFL tight end
Dorne Dibble, (1929–2018), NFL wide receiver
Matt Kohn, National Association of Intercollegiate Athletics head football coach 
Margaret Wynne Lawless, (1847–1926), poet, author, educator, philanthropist
Mike Marshall, (1943–2021), Major League Baseball pitcher
William Reid, (1893–1955), college basketball coach and administrator 

Mattie Montgomery, former lead vocalist and frontman of Christian metal band For Today.

References

External links

School district website

Schools in Lenawee County, Michigan
Public high schools in Michigan
1857 establishments in Michigan